The 54th Guksu ran from 26 July 2010 to 14 February 2011. The defending champion was Lee Chang-ho. Choi Cheol-han won the right to challenge Chang-ho for his title. Cheol-han beat Chang-ho three to one in the finals to claim the title.

Tournament

Finals

References

2011 in go
Go competitions in South Korea